The 2010–11 UEFA Champions League was the 56th season of Europe's premier club football tournament organised by UEFA, and the 19th under the UEFA Champions League format. The final was held at Wembley Stadium in London on 28 May 2011, where Barcelona defeated Manchester United 3–1. Internazionale were the defending champions, but were eliminated by Schalke 04 in the quarter-finals. As winners, Barcelona earned berths in the 2011 UEFA Super Cup and the 2011 FIFA Club World Cup.

Association team allocation

A total of 76 teams participated in the 2010–11 Champions League, from 52 UEFA associations (Liechtenstein organises no domestic league competition). Associations were allocated places according to their 2009 UEFA country coefficient, which took into account their performance in European competitions from 2004–05 to 2008–09.

Below is the qualification scheme for the 2010–11 UEFA Champions League:
Associations 1–3 each have four teams qualify
Associations 4–6 each have three teams qualify
Associations 7–15 each have two teams qualify
Associations 16–53 each have one team qualify (excluding Liechtenstein)

Association ranking

Distribution
Since the winners of the 2009–10 UEFA Champions League, Internazionale, obtained a place in the group stage through their domestic league placing, the reserved title holder spot in the group stage was effectively vacated. To compensate:
 The champions of association 13 (Scotland) were promoted from the third qualifying round to the group stage.
 The champions of association 16 (Denmark) were promoted from the second qualifying round to the third qualifying round.
 The champions of associations 48 and 49 (Faroe Islands and Luxembourg) were promoted from the first qualifying round to the second qualifying round.

Teams
League positions of the previous season shown in parentheses.

TH Title Holder

Round and draw dates
All draws held at UEFA headquarters in Nyon, Switzerland unless stated otherwise.

Seeding
The draws for the qualifying rounds, the play-off round and the group stage are all seeded based on the 2010 UEFA club coefficients. The coefficients are calculated on the basis of a combination of 20% of the value of the respective national association's coefficient for the period from 2005–06 to 2009–10 inclusive and the clubs' individual performances in the UEFA club competitions during the same period. Clubs are ordered by their coefficients and then divided into pots as required.

In the draws for the qualifying rounds and the play-off round, the teams are divided evenly into one seeded and one unseeded pot, based on their club coefficients. A seeded team is drawn against an unseeded team, with the order of legs in each tie also being decided randomly. Due to the limited time between matches, the draws for the second and third qualifying rounds take place before the results of the previous round are known. The seeding in each draw is carried out under the assumption that all of the highest-ranked clubs of the previous round are victorious. If a lower-ranked club is victorious, it simply takes the place of its defeated opponent in the next round. Moreover, in the third qualifying round and play-off round, champion clubs and non-champion clubs are kept separated. Prior to these draws, UEFA may form "groups" in accordance with the principles set by the Club Competitions Committee, but they are purely for convenience of the draw and do not resemble any real groupings in the sense of the competition, while ensuring that teams from the same association not drawn against each other.

In the draw for the group stage, the 32 teams are split into four pots of eight teams, based on their club coefficients, with the title holder automatically placed into Pot 1. Each group contains one team from each pot, but teams from the same association cannot be drawn into the same group. The draw is controlled in order to split teams of the same national association evenly between Groups A-D and Groups E-H, where the two sets of groups alternate between playing on Tuesdays and Wednesdays for each matchday.

In the draw for the first knockout stage, the eight group winners are seeded, and the eight group runners-up are unseeded. A seeded team is drawn against an unseeded team, with the seeded team hosting the second leg. Teams from the same group or the same association cannot be drawn against each other.

In the draws for the quarter-finals onwards, there are no seedings, and teams from the same group or the same association may be drawn with each other.

Qualifying rounds

In the qualifying and play-off rounds, teams play against each other over two legs on a home-and-away basis.

The draws for the first two qualifying rounds were held on 21 June 2010 by UEFA General Secretary Gianni Infantino and Michael Heselschwerdt, Head of Club Competitions, while the draw for the third qualifying round was held on 16 July 2010 by UEFA General Secretary Gianni Infantino and Giorgio Marchetti, Competitions Director.

First qualifying round
The first legs were planned to be played on 29 and 30 June, and the second legs were played on 6 and 7 July 2010. However, the first match of the entire competition (FC Santa Coloma vs. Birkirkara on 29 June) was cancelled due to the pitch being declared unfit.

Second qualifying round
The first legs were played on 13 and 14 July, and the second legs were played on 20 and 21 July 2010.

Third qualifying round
The third qualifying round was split into two separate sections: one for champions and one for non-champions. The losing teams in both sections entered the play-off round of the 2010–11 UEFA Europa League. The first legs were played on 27 and 28 July, and the second legs were played on 3 and 4 August 2010.

Play-off round

The draw for the play-off round was held on 6 August 2010 by UEFA General Secretary Gianni Infantino and UEFA Competitions Director Giorgio Marchetti. The play-off round was split into two separate sections: one for champions and one for non-champions. The losing teams in both sections entered the group stage of the 2010–11 UEFA Europa League. The first legs were played on 17 and 18 August, and the second legs were played on 24 and 25 August 2010.

Following a trial at the previous year's UEFA Europa League, UEFA announced that in both the 2010–11 and 2011–12 competitions, two extra officials would be used – with one on each goal line.

Group stage

The 32 clubs were drawn into eight groups of four on 26 August 2010 in Monaco. In each group, teams play against each other home-and-away in a round-robin format. The matchdays are 14–15 September, 28–29 September, 19–20 October, 2–3 November, 23–24 November, and 7–8 December 2010. The group winners and runners-up advance to the round of 16, while the third-placed teams enter the round of 32 of the 2010–11 UEFA Europa League.

If two or more teams are equal on points on completion of the group matches, the following criteria are applied to determine the rankings (in descending order):
 higher number of points obtained in the group matches played among the teams in question;
 superior goal difference from the group matches played among the teams in question;
 higher number of goals scored away from home in the group matches played among the teams in question;
 superior goal difference from all group matches played;
 higher number of goals scored;
 higher number of coefficient points accumulated by the club in question, as well as its association, over the previous five seasons.

Bursaspor, Hapoel Tel Aviv, Braga, Tottenham Hotspur, Twente and Žilina made their debut in the group stage. Bursaspor, Hapoel Tel Aviv, and Žilina came last in their respective groups, Twente and Braga came third in their respective groups and dropped into the knockout stages of the Europa League, and Tottenham Hotspur came first in their group and continued to play in the knockout stages of the tournament.

Group A

Group B

Group C

Group D

Group E

Group F

Group G

Group H

Knockout phase

In the knockout phase, teams play against each other over two legs on a home-and-away basis, except for the one-match final.

The draw for the round of 16 was held on 17 December 2010. The draws for the quarter-finals, semi-finals and final (to determine the "home" team) was held on 18 March 2011.

Bracket

Round of 16
The first legs of the round of 16 were played on 15, 16, 22 and 23 February, and the second legs were played on 8, 9, 15 and 16 March 2011.

|}

Quarter-finals
The first legs were played on 5 and 6 April, and the second legs were played on 12 and 13 April 2011.

|}

Semi-finals
The first legs were played on 26 and 27 April, and the second legs were played on 3 and 4 May 2011.

|}

Final

The 2011 UEFA Champions League Final was played on 28 May 2011 at Wembley Stadium in London, England.

Statistics
Statistics exclude qualifying rounds and play-off round.

Top goalscorers

Source: Top Scorers – Final – Saturday 28 May 2011 (after match) (accessed 28 May 2011)

Top assists

Prize money
Just for being in the group stage, each club received €3.9 million (compared with €3.8 million last season 2009–2010), followed by €550,000 for each group match they played, or €3.3 million for the whole group stage, giving them each a total of €7.2 million in participation bonuses. In addition, each club had the possibility of netting up to €4.8m in group stage performance bonuses (€800,000 for a win; €400,000 for a draw). Real Madrid CF took the most from this pot, with a near-maximum €4.4 million. A place in the round of 16 was worth €3 million, in the quarter-finals €3.3 million and in the semi-finals €4.2 million. The overall winners, FC Barcelona, received an additional €9 million, bringing their total bonuses to €30.7 million (out of a maximum €31.5 million). Manchester United FC, the runners-up, received a final match bonus of €5.6 million. The second payments category, the market pool, depends primarily on the value of the clubs' domestic markets. If an association is represented by more than one club, however, the clubs' shares are calculated, first, on the basis of their position in the previous season's domestic championship and, second, on the basis of the number of matches they play in the competition (group stage onwards). With €27.023m, Chelsea FC received the largest market pool share of all the clubs in the 2010/11 UEFA Champions League. In addition, the clubs all keep their own gate receipts.

See also
 2009–10 UEFA Champions League
 2010–11 UEFA Europa League
 2011 FIFA Club World Cup
 2011 UEFA Super Cup
 2010–11 UEFA Women's Champions League

References

External links

2010–11 All matches – season at UEFA website
2010–11 UEFA Champions League, UEFA.com
 All scorers 2010–11 UEFA Champions League (excluding qualifying round) according to protocols UEFA + all scorers qualifying round
 2010/11 UEFA Champions League – results and line-ups (archive)

 
1
UEFA Champions League seasons
Champions
Champions